Charles Edward Cornish (9 October 1842 – 14 July 1936) was an Anglican bishop in the late 19th and early 20th centuries.

Early life

Cornish was born to Charles Lewis Cornish (then Dean of Exeter College, Oxford) and Eleanor Monro in London, England on 9 October 1842. He was educated at Uppingham and Exeter College, Oxford, where he graduated with an MA and DD He also earned an MA from the University of Cape Town.

He married Mary Randall, daughter of Henry Randall (later Archdeacon of Bristol) in Bristol in 1867.

Church career
Cornish was ordained in 1870. After a curacy at St George's, Bristol, he held incumbencies at St Peter and St Paul, South Petherton and St Mary Redcliffe, Bristol; his wife's father had earlier also been vicar of St Mary Redcliffe. In 1899, he was appointed Bishop of Grahamstown, Cape Colony, a post he held for 16 years.

He died on 14 July 1936.

Publications

References

Sources

External links

1842 births
People educated at Uppingham School
Alumni of Exeter College, Oxford
Anglican bishops of Grahamstown
19th-century Anglican Church of Southern Africa bishops
20th-century Anglican Church of Southern Africa bishops
1936 deaths